Magnificence is a 1973 play by English playwright Howard Brenton. It premiered at the Royal Court Theatre and was next performed on the London stage in 2016, at the Finborough Theatre.

Synopsis 
Magnificence has two plotlines. Firstly, five far-left revolutionaries squat an unoccupied house in London. Secondly, a Conservative cabinet MP loses faith in himself. The two plotlines converge in the final scene, where Jed (one of the revolutionaries) accidentally kills both himself and the MP with plastic explosive.

The published text of the play takes as its epigraph lines from Brecht's Die Maßnahme:

Productions

Premiere 
Magnificence premiered at the Royal Court Theatre on 28 June 1973 with the following cast:
 Will - Michael Kitchen
 Jed - Kenneth Cranham
 Mary - Carole Hayman
 Veronica - Dinah Stabb
 Cliff - Pete Postlethwaite
 Constable - James Aubrey
 Slaughter - Leonard Fenton
 Alice - Geoffrey Chater
 Babs - Robert Eddison
 Old Man/Lenin - Nikolaj Ryjtkov

It was directed by Max Stafford-Clark, designed by William Dudley and the lighting was by Andy Phillips. Irving Wardle, writing in The Times, called it a wonderful piece of theatre.

2016 

Magnificence was performed at the Finborough Theatre in 2016, marking its first appearance in London since the premiere. The reviews were favourable, with the Evening Standard commenting that "Brenton’s vision of revolutionary zeal is memorably strange". For BroadwayWorld the play was "both epic and intimate" and the Guardian wrote that "the play’s anger about the co-existence of homelessness and empty property still strikes a chord".

References

British plays
1973 plays